Hakim El Bounadi (born 9 August 1986) is a French football midfielder who plays for AS Huningue.

Club career
In the summer of 2018, El Bounadi joined Swiss club AS Timau Basel. One year later, he returned to France and joined AS Huningue.

International career
Although Hakim could play for either France or Morocco, he decided to play for Morocco.

References

External links
 
 
 

Living people
1986 births
French footballers
Association football midfielders
FC Sochaux-Montbéliard players
Clermont Foot players
ASM Belfort players
RWS Bruxelles players
FC Saint-Louis Neuweg players
FC Mulhouse players
Ligue 1 players
Ligue 2 players
Championnat National 2 players
Championnat National 3 players
Challenger Pro League players
French sportspeople of Moroccan descent
Expatriate footballers in Belgium
Expatriate footballers in Switzerland
French expatriate sportspeople in Belgium
French expatriate sportspeople in Switzerland